Brima Kamara (5 May 1972 – 7 July 1999) was a Sierra Leonean professional footballer who played as a goalkeeper. He was a squad member for the 1994 and 1996 African Cup of Nations.

References

1972 births
1999 deaths
Sierra Leonean footballers
Association football goalkeepers
Sierra Leone international footballers
1994 African Cup of Nations players
1996 African Cup of Nations players
East End Lions F.C. players
El Mansoura SC players
Sierra Leonean expatriate footballers
Sierra Leonean expatriate sportspeople in Egypt
Expatriate footballers in Egypt